Dongzhi may refer to:

Dongzhi (solar term), a solar term in East Asian calendars
Dongzhi Festival, a festival celebrated by the Chinese and other East Asians 
Dongzhi County, in Anhui, China
Dong Zhi (archer), a Chinese paralympic archer.
Dongzhi Man, a Homo erectus specimen from Dongzhi County